The Trinity Episcopal Church is a historic church at 131 W. Emerson Street in Melrose, Massachusetts.  The main church building was constructed in 1886 to a design by Boston architect Charles Brigham.  It is connected to its parish house, built in 1936 with a significant addition in 1956.  The main building is English Revival (Tudor) in styling. Its walls are made of multiple colors of granite, and are topped by a steeply pitched slate roof.  There is a large projecting gable section on the southern facade, which, along with the tower in the southeastern corner, has the half-timber styling typical of the Tudor Revival.   The eastern facade has a projecting curved section, which houses the apse on the interior; it is from this section that the church is connected to the parish house via the somewhat utilitarian 1956 addition.  The parish house was designed in Shingle Style by Boston architect and parish member William H. Smith, although with sympathy to the Tudor styling of the church.

The church was listed on the National Register of Historic Places in 1995.

See also
National Register of Historic Places listings in Middlesex County, Massachusetts

References

Episcopal church buildings in Massachusetts
Buildings and structures in Melrose, Massachusetts
Churches on the National Register of Historic Places in Massachusetts
Shingle Style church buildings
Churches in Middlesex County, Massachusetts
Stone churches in Massachusetts
National Register of Historic Places in Middlesex County, Massachusetts
Shingle Style architecture in Massachusetts